Stooky Bill was the name given to the head of a ventriloquist dummy that Scottish television pioneer John Logie Baird used in his 1924 experiments to transmit a televised image between rooms in his laboratory at 22 Frith Street, London.

Baird invented some of the first experimental television systems.  In 1924 he developed a mechanical television system to transmit moving images by means of electrical signals, which he demonstrated on 25 March 1925 at a London department store, Selfridges.   It consisted of a spinning disk set with a spiral pattern of 30 lenses.  As each lens rotated past the illuminated subject, it focused the light from a spot on the subject on a selenium photoelectric cell.  This converted the brightness of the image at each spot into a proportional electric signal, which could be sent to a receiver by radio waves.  As each lens swept past the subject, it scanned a successive line of the image.  At the receiver, a light shining through the holes in a similar rotating disk recreated an image of the subject.

Due to the low sensitivity of the photoelectric cells, Baird's first system was not able to televise human faces, because they had inadequate contrast.  So Baird used a ventriloquist's dummy, whose brightly painted face had greater contrast, and made it move and talk before the scanner.  Stooky Bill and another Baird dummy, "James" have been jokingly called "the first television actors".

"Stooky" or "stookie" is Scots for stucco or plaster of Paris, or for a plaster cast used to immobilise bone fractures. The term  is also used for someone who is slow-witted or awkward in his movements. The incandescent lights illuminating the subject to be televised generated so much heat that Baird couldn't use a human for the testing, so Stooky Bill was used.   Eventually the hair became singed and the painted face became cracked by the heat.

See also
Mechanical television
History of television
Phonovision

References

External links 
David Hall's video art piece Stooky Bill TV, for Channel 4 TV 1990
John Logie Baird's test subject 'Stookie Bill', Science Museum Group Collection
John Burnside; Kirsty Wark; Alistair McGowan The Ballad of Stooky Bill; BBC Radio 4
History of television
Ventriloquists' dummies